The Brewarrina Riot occurred on 15 August 1987 in Brewarrina, New South Wales. It was a significant event in Aboriginal history and race relations in Australia, as well as having continuing legal impact for years afterwards.

Over 150 Aboriginal Australians rioted on the town's main street, causing property damage and clashing with police, in response to the death in custody of local Aboriginal man Lloyd Boney, who had been found hanged with a sock in his cell. The riot occurred as a flare-up of long-running tensions between Aboriginal people in the far west of the state during the 1980s, and police treatment of Aboriginal people was under increased media scrutiny during years leading up to the Royal Commission into Aboriginal Deaths in Custody, which had been announced on 10 August 1987.

The event and the trial of the Aboriginal men that followed, which lasted for five years, was widely covered in the press, represented in differing ways.

Much has been written by academics and others about the significance and interpretations of the riot. Barry Morris of the University of Newcastle wrote "The Brewarrina 'riot' acted as a switch point, where both conservative and liberal polity contested the changing nature of Aboriginal autonomy and polity within the Australian state".
 Roderic Pitty notes that the riot lasted for about half an hour, not five hours, as recorded in the Encyclopaedia of Aboriginal Australia, and says that the grounds on which the men were convicted were very shaky..

References

External links 
 

1987 riots
Race riots in Australia
Riots and civil disorder in New South Wales
Indigenous Australians in New South Wales
Indigenous Australian politics